Stop the Pounding Heart is a 2013 documentary drama film written and directed by Roberto Minervini. It is a co-production between the United States, Italy and France and had a special screening at the 2013 Cannes Film Festival. It was screened in the Contemporary World Cinema section at the 2013 Toronto International Film Festival.

Cast
 Sara Carlson as Sara
 Colby Trichell as Colby
 Tim Carlson as Himself
 LeeAnne Carlson as Herself
 Katarina Carlson as Herself
 Christin Carlson as Herself
 Grace Carlson as Herself
 Linnea Carlson as Herself
 Emma Carlson as Herself
 Timothy Carlson as Himself

References

External links
 

2013 films
American drama films
Belgian drama films
Films shot in Texas
Italian drama films
2013 documentary films
American documentary films
Belgian documentary films
Italian documentary films
2013 drama films
2010s English-language films
2010s American films